Conan Whitehead (born 18 February 1986) is an English professional darts player who competes in events of the Professional Darts Corporation (PDC).

Career

Whitehead has competed in numerous competitions throughout his career, starting in 2008. In 2009, he won the 2009 Kent Open, beating Steve Douglas in the final. Since then, he has only been in one other final. This was in the 2016 England Open where he lost 3–6 to Glen Durrant. He reached the quarter-final of the 2017 BDO World Trophy, his best TV major performance to date. This was equalled at his third appearance at the BDO World Darts Championship (in 2019) where he knocked out top-seed Mark McGeeney before losing to Scott Waites in the quarter-finals.

PDC

In January 2019, Whitehead entered PDC UK Q-School and did enough to earn a two-year tour card by finishing in the top 11 of the Order of Merit.

World Championship results

BDO

 2017: First round (lost to Darius Labanauskas 1–3)
 2018: Second round (lost to Jim Williams 3–4)
 2019: Quarter-final (lost to Scott Waites 3–5)

Performance timeline

References

External links
 

1986 births
English darts players
British bricklayers
Living people
British Darts Organisation players
Professional Darts Corporation former tour card holders